Juriniopsis is a genus of flies in the family Tachinidae.

Species
J. adusta (van der Wulp, 1888
J. aurifrons Brooks, 1949
J. floridensis Townsend, 1916
J. lampuris Reinhard, 1953

References

Bugguide.net. Genus Juriniopsis

Tachininae
Tachinidae genera
Taxa named by Charles Henry Tyler Townsend